David Sauerland (born 28 June 1997) is a German professional footballer who plays as a defender for Alemannia Aachen.

References

External links
 
 Profile at kicker.de
 

1997 births
Living people
Sportspeople from Münster
Footballers from North Rhine-Westphalia
German footballers
Germany youth international footballers
Association football defenders
Borussia Dortmund II players
Eintracht Braunschweig players
Rot-Weiss Essen players
Alemannia Aachen players
3. Liga players
Regionalliga players